Özden Örnek (2 February 1943, İzmit – 29 April 2018) was a Turkish admiral. He was the Commander of the Turkish Naval Forces from 2003 to 2005. In 2012 Örnek was sentenced to twenty years in prison for his alleged role in the 2003 "Sledgehammer" coup plan.

In 2007, the Nokta weekly published portions of a diary purportedly belonging to the Örnek, indicating that four other coup plans were prepared: Sarıkız (blonde girl; idiomatic for 'cow'), Ayışığı (moonlight), Yakamoz (Sea Sparkle), and Eldiven (glove). Admiral Örnek himself called the diary a forgery. The Armed Forces has prevaricated on this issue without denying its authenticity altogether.

In 2015, he was acquitted after the case's prosecutor argued that digital data in the files submitted as evidence in the case was “fake” and did not constitute evidence.

He is the father of film director Tolga Örnek.

References 

1943 births
2018 deaths
Commanders of the Turkish Naval Forces
People from İzmit